Fernando Madrigal González (born 12 November 1991), is a Mexican professional footballer who plays as a midfielder for Liga MX club Necaxa.

References

External links
 
  
 
 
 

1991 births
Living people
Mexican footballers
Association football midfielders
Unión de Curtidores footballers
Alebrijes de Oaxaca players
C.F. Pachuca players
Mineros de Zacatecas players
Atlético San Luis footballers
Liga MX players
Ascenso MX players
Liga Premier de México players
Tercera División de México players
Footballers from Guanajuato
Sportspeople from León, Guanajuato